Anna Caterina Antonacci (born 5 April 1961) is an Italian soprano known for roles in the bel canto and Baroque repertories. She performed as a mezzo-soprano for several years, particularly performing the Rossini canon.

Career
Antonacci studied in Bologna and made her debut as Rosina in 1986 at Arezzo. In 1994, she made her Royal Opera debut as Elcia in Mosè in Egitto. She appeared there again in 2006 with Jonas Kaufman. She was profiled at length by The New York Times in March 2012. In 2013, she appeared in La voix humaine at the Opéra-Comique.

Repertory 
Bellini: Adalgisa (Norma), Romeo (I Capuleti e i Montecchi)
Berlioz: Cassandre (Les Troyens), Marguerite (La damnation de Faust), Cléopâtre (La mort de Cléopâtre)
Bizet: Carmen (Carmen)
Cherubini: Medea (Medea)
Cimarosa:Orazia (Gli Orazi ed i Curiazi)
Donizetti: Elisabetta (Maria Stuarda)
Gluck: Alceste (Alceste), Armide (Armide), Iphigénie (Iphigénie en Tauride)
Halévy: Rachel (La Juive)
Handel: Agrippina (Agrippina), Rodelinda (Rodelinda), Serse (Serse)
Manfroce: Polyxena (Ecuba)
Massenet: Charlotte (Werther)
Mayr: Clotilde (La rosa bianca e la rosa rossa)
Monteverdi: both Poppea and Nerone (L'incoronazione di Poppea)
Mozart: both Fiordiligi and Dorabella (Così fan tutte), Donna Elvira (Don Giovanni), Vitellia (La clemenza di Tito), Elettra (Idomeneo)
Paisiello: Elfrida (Elfrida), Nina (Nina)
Puccini: Kate Pinkerton (Madama Butterfly)
Rossini: Rosina (Il barbiere di siviglia), Dorliska (Torvaldo e Dorliska), Ninetta (La gazza ladra), Semiramide (Semiramide), Ermione (Ermione), Elisabetta (Elisabetta, regina d'Inghilterra), Elena (La donna del lago), Zelmira (Zelmira), Elcia (Mosè in Egitto), Anaï (Moïse), Angelina (La Cenerentola)
Verdi: Flora (La traviata), both Alice Ford and Meg Page (Falstaff), Marchesa del Poggio (Un giorno di regno)

Discography 
Operas
 Berlioz: Les Troyens, John Eliot Gardiner, Théâtre du Châtelet
 Bizet: Carmen, Antonio Pappano, Covent Garden
 Handel: Rodelinda, William Christie, Glyndebourne Opera
 Marschner: Hans Heiling, Cagliari Opera
 Monteverdi: L'incoronazione di Poppea, Ivor Bolton, Bavarian State Opera
 Mozart: Così fan tutte (Fiordiligi), Gustav Kuhn, 
 Mozart: Don Giovanni, Riccardo Muti, Vienna State Opera
 Rossini: Ermione, Andrew Davis, Glyndebourne
 Verdi: Falstaff (Meg Page), Riccardo Muti, La Scala

Solo
 Era La Notte/Anna Caterina Antonacci (Monteverdi, Strozzi, Giramo)
 Monteverdi, Giramo, Strozzi, Carissimi, Cesti: "Lamenti Barocchi" Sergio Vartolo, Naxos 1995

References 

Jessica Duchen, "Prima Donna Autentica", Opera News, June 2011, Vol. 75, No. 12.
Christiansen, Rupert, "The Callas of our time?", The Daily Telegraph, 20 October 2006. Accessed 26 February 2009.
Fisher, Neil, "Anna Caterina Antonacci: the riddle of the sphinx", The Times, 16 January 2009. Accessed 26 February 2009.
"Antonacci, Anna Caterina" by Elizabeth Forbes, Grove Music Online. Accessed via subscription 25 February 2009.

External links
Anna Caterina Antonacci, Askonas Holt Artists' Management
Interview with Antonacci by Luiz Gazzola, July 2012, Opera Lively
Anna Caterina Antonacci, Operabase

1961 births
Italian operatic sopranos
Italian mezzo-sopranos
Musicians from Ferrara
Living people